Antonio Dal Monte (Rome, October 31, 1931) is an Italian physician. He is the former Scientific Director and Head of the Department of Physiology and Biomechanics Institute of Sports Science of the Italian National Olympic Committee (C.O.N.I.).

Early life 
Dal Monte graduated from the faculty of Medicine and Surgery at the University of Rome, then obtained a teaching qualification in Physiology Human and Sports Medicine.  He is also a specialist in Pneumology, Occupational Medicine, and in aerospace medicine.

Career 
Dal Monte served as Scientific Director and Head of the Department of Physiology and Biomechanics Institute of Science of the Italian National Olympic Committee Sport (CONI). 

He is one of the founders of the science of functional evaluation of athletes. He taught at the School of Specialization in Sports Medicine for Doctor of the University of Rome La Sapienza, of  the Catholic University of  Sacred Heart of Rome and of the University of L'Aquila.

For more than 35 years, Dal Monte consulted with Fiat (FCA) in the field of the vehicle seat and on-board instrumentation design as well as the study of ergonomic driving positions and posture of race vehicles, motorboats, aircraft, and gliders — to understand and optimize the operational relationship of man and machine. Consulting with Fiat (FCA), Dal Monte designed seats for the Fiat Idea using biometric principles developed at the Italian National Olympic Committee's sports medicine institute.

Dal Monte carried out scientific work in the field of evaluation of cardio-circulatory, respiratory, metabolic, and biomechanical of athletes, reflected in the publication of books, monographs, and articles. He designed numerous devices, notably an ergometer for the field study of athletes and for the laboratory simulation of the sporting gesture.

Recognition
2006 Honorary Doctorate  in Sciences and Techniques of Sports (University of L'Aquila)

References

External links
PubMed search  -  Antonio Dal Monte

Italian sports physicians
1931 births
Living people
Physicians from Rome
University of Rome Tor Vergata alumni